Zamalek Sporting Club is an Egyptian sporting club based in Meet Okba, Giza, which is currently competes in 2020–21 Egyptian Premier League. The club was formed in 1911 by George Marzbach as Qasr El-Nil.

The team that Zamalek have met the most in Egyptian Premier League is El Ittihad with 110 matches. El-Zamalek have won 68 of the league matches against El Itthad, which represents the most Zamalek have won against any team. El-Zamalek have drawn more matches with Al Ahly SC more than any other team.

Key

The records include the result of matches that were in canceled seasons (1954–55, 1971–72, 1973–74, 1989–90, 2011–12 and 2012–13).
P = matches played; W = matches won; D = matches drawn; L = Matches lost; Win% = percentage of total matches won; GS = goals scored; GA = goals against.
Cairo Zone League matches are excluded.
Results against each opponent include results against that team under any former name. For example; results against Shobra El-Kheima include matches played against Plastic.
  Teams with this background and symbol in the "Team" column are current divisional rivals of Zamalek.

All-time league record

References

General

Zamalek SC
Zamalek SC matches
Zamalek SC